Konda (Ogit, Yabin) is the westernmost mainland Trans–New Guinea language. It is spoken in the villages of Wamargege and Konda villages in Konda District (near Teminabuan District), Sorong Selatan Regency.

References

Konda–Yahadian languages